Dunfermline (Scottish Gaelic: Dùn Phàrlain, Scots: Dunfaurlin) was a local government district in the Fife region of Scotland from 1975 to 1996, lying to the south-west of the regional capital Glenrothes.

Local Government 
As its name suggests, the district (one of three in the Fife region, along with Kirkcaldy and North-East Fife) was centred around the town of Dunfermline, an important royal burgh in the historic county of Fife, although its boundaries extended some way beyond the town. In the Local Government (Scotland) Act 1973 leading to its creation, the district's desired composition was described as:
In the county of Fife—the burghs of Cowdenbeath, Culross, Dunfermline, Inverkeithing, Lochgelly; the districts of Dunfermline, Lochgelly (except the electoral divisions of Auchterderran, Denend, Kinglassie, New Carden); that part of the electoral division of Auchtertool within the Gray Park polling district.

Outwith the main town, the district encompassed port towns on the Firth of Forth, other coastal villages and numerous inland settlements west of Dunfermline, plus further territory east of the M90 motorway including Kelty, the Benarty villages and the towns of Cowdenbeath and Lochgelly. Its northern borders were with Clackmannan district in the Central region and Perth and Kinross district in the Tayside region.

The Local Government etc. (Scotland) Act 1994 abolished all of the districts and regions. Fife was retained as a single unitary council area, headquartered in Glenrothes as the regional council had also been. Similar boundaries as those of Dunfermline district have since been re-used for some purposes such as local economic planning, tourism, and in the post-2005 Dunfermline and West Fife (UK Parliament constituency), although rarely including the settlements east of the M90.

See also 
 1992 Dunfermline District Council election
 Subdivisions of Scotland

References

Districts of Scotland
Dunfermline
Politics of Fife
1975 establishments in Scotland
1996 disestablishments in Scotland
Cowdenbeath
Kelty